Edin Đerlek (born 23 January 1987) is a Serbian lawyer and politician serving as minister without portfolio since 2022. An ethnic Bosniak, he is a vice-president of the Justice and Reconciliation Party (SPP).

Early life 
Edin Đerlek was born on 23 January 1987 in Belgrade, Socialist Republic of Serbia, Socialist Federal Republic of Yugoslavia. He graduated from the University "Abu Nour" in Damascus, Syria in 2009, after which he enrolled into the Faculty of Islamic Studies in Novi Pazar, where he studied sharia.

Career 
Đerlek is a member of the Justice and Reconciliation Party (SPP). Đerlek was the candidate of SPP for the National Assembly in 2016 and 2020, but failed to obtain a seat. Between 2016 and 2022, he served as a member of the City Assembly of Novi Pazar. As of 2022, he serves as the vice-president of SPP.

Minister without portfolio 
It was announced on 24 October 2022 that Đerlek would serve as minister without portfolio in the third cabinet of Ana Brnabić. Following the announcement, Đerlek stated that "he would work in interests of Bosniaks, Sandžak, and the state". He was sworn in on 26 October.

Personal life 
By profession, he is a lawyer. He speaks Arabic, English, and Russian.

References 

1987 births
Politicians from Belgrade
Justice and Reconciliation Party politicians
Government ministers of Serbia
Damascus University alumni
21st-century Serbian politicians
Bosniaks of Serbia
Living people